Jacek Andrzej Łągwa (born 11 October 1969 in Łódź, Poland) is a Polish musician, composer, actor and vocalist of the famous Polish band Ich Troje.

His parents are actors Janina Borońska and Andrzej Łągwa. As an actor played a role of Zbigniew in 1978 movie Pogrzeb świerszcza. As a composer created and performed soundtracks to such movies as Godzina (1991), Gwiazdor (2002) and Lawstorant (2005).

Finished a singing form of the secondary musical school in Łódź.

He used to play in Polish bands Tamerlane and Varius Manx.

In 2007 divorced his wife Dorota with whom he has two daughters.

Discography 

 Rozdział drugi  (2009)

References

External links
 Official web site

1969 births
Living people
Polish male actors
Polish composers
Polish musicians
Polish male singers
Polish pop singers
Eurovision Song Contest entrants for Poland
Eurovision Song Contest entrants of 2003
Eurovision Song Contest entrants of 2006
Musicians from Łódź